No Sign of Life is the fourteenth studio album by the Swedish death metal band Unleashed. It was released by the music label Napalm Records on 12 October 2021.

Background
No Sign of Life was recorded at Chrome Studios in Stockholm, Sweden. It was produced and mixed by Fredrik Folkare. It was mastered by Erik Martensson. Three music videos were released for the album. The videos for "The King Lost His Crown" and "Where Can You Flee?" are lyric videos, while the video for "You Are the Warrior!" is a typical music video.  

The album is a concept album based on vocalist/bassist Johnny Hedlund's unpublished novel that takes place in the world of Odalheim. There's a single plot that runs through it, and it's the same one that runs across the band's prior four releases. This isn't just another death metal album; it's the fifth installment of a gigantic, epic Viking mythological saga set after Ragnarok.

The band while speaking about the album said "It is our hope that our warriors all over the world will enjoy the new album just like they have our previous ones. We have, as always, tried to stick to our roots while testing our steel to develop the genre of Viking death metal even further. Hail Odin!"

Reception

The album was well received by both fans and critics. Joseph Mitchell of Rock 'N' Load said "The album "No Sign Of Life" is unrivaled. Even after 14 full-length albums, the band still has so much to contribute and create. Unleashed has been able to improve their sound since their inception. Unleashed have been able to build albums with longevity and write albums that are crushing and catchy to this day, whilst many bands have made big genre shifts or recycle the same content over and over." Furthermore, Tim Bolitho-Jones of Distorted Sound said "This is old school death metal at its finest, played rapidly, aggressively, and heavily."

Track listing

Personnel
Unleashed
 Johnny Hedlund – vocals, bass
 Fredrik Folkare – lead guitar
 Tomas Masgard - rhythm guitar
 Anders Schultz – drums

Production
 Fredrik Folkare – producer, mixing
 Erik Mårtensson - mastering

Charts

References

2021 albums
Unleashed (band) albums
Napalm Records albums